The Bloaja is a left tributary of the river Cavnic in Romania. It flows into the Cavnic in Copalnic-Mănăștur.

References

Rivers of Romania
Rivers of Maramureș County